YouTube Premium (formerly Music Key and YouTube Red) is a subscription service offered by the video platform YouTube. The service provides ad-free access to content across the service, as well as access to premium YouTube Originals programming produced in collaboration with the site's creators, downloading videos and background playback of videos on mobile devices, and access to the YouTube Music music streaming service.

The service was originally launched on November 14, 2014, as Music Key, offering advertisement-free streaming of music videos from participating labels on YouTube and Google Play Music. The service was then revised and relaunched as YouTube Red on October 31, 2015, expanding its scope to offer advertisement-free access to all YouTube videos, as opposed to just music.

YouTube announced the rebranding of the service as YouTube Premium on May 17, 2018, alongside the return of a separate, YouTube Music subscription service. Later in the year, it was reported that YouTube was planning to make some of the original content associated with the service available on an ad-supported basis.

History 

The service was first unveiled in November 2014 as Music Key, serving as a collaboration between YouTube and Google Play Music, and meant to succeed the former's own subscription service. Music Key offered ad-free playback of music videos from participating labels hosted on YouTube, as well as background and offline playback of music videos on mobile devices from within the YouTube app. The service also included access to Google Play Music All Access, which provides ad-free audio streaming of a library of music. Alongside Music Key, Google also introduced tighter integration between Play Music and YouTube's apps, including the sharing of music recommendations, and access to YouTube's music videos from within the Play Music app. Music Key was not YouTube's first foray into premium content, having launched film rentals in 2010, and premium, subscription-based channels in 2013.

During its invite-only beta, Music Key faced mixed reception due to the limited scope of the offering; YouTube's chief business officer Robert Kyncl explained that his daughter was confused over why videos of songs from Frozen were not "music" in the scope of the service, and thus not advertisement-free. These concerns and others led to a revamping of the Music Key concept to create YouTube Red; unlike Music Key, YouTube Red was designed to provide ad-free streaming to all videos, rather than just music content. This shift required YouTube to seek permission from its content creators and rights holders to allow their content to be part of the ad-free service; under the new contract terms, partners would receive a share of the total revenue from YouTube Red subscriptions, as determined by how much their content is viewed by subscribers.

YouTube also sought to compete against sites such as Netflix, Amazon Prime Video and Hulu by offering original content (YouTube Originals) as part of the subscription service, leveraging prominent YouTube personalities in combination with professional producers. Robert Kyncl acknowledged that many of YouTube's prominent personalities had built their followings and created content while operating on a "shoestring budget", but he maintained that "in order to scale up, it takes a different kind of enterprise, a different kind of skill set" such as story-telling and "showrunning". Prominent YouTube personality PewDiePie, who was involved in one of the planned originals for the service, explained that the service was meant to mitigate profit loss from the use of ad blocking.

YouTube Red was officially unveiled on October 21, 2015. On May 18, 2016, YouTube Red and YouTube Music launched in Australia and New Zealand, the first countries to gain access to the service outside the United States.
On August 3, 2016, YouTube Red support was added to the YouTube Kids app. On December 6, 2016, YouTube Red expanded to South Korea. On August 17, 2017, the service launched in Mexico.

As YouTube Premium 
On June 18, 2018, YouTube rebranded the service as YouTube Premium. The price of the service also changed from US$9.99 to US$11.99 per month for new subscribers. The existing pricing, as well as bundling of YouTube Premium with Google Play Music, was grandfathered in some countries for those who subscribed prior to the rebranding. Alongside the rebranding, the service also expanded into Canada, and 11 European countries (Austria, Finland, France, Germany, Ireland, Italy, Norway, Russia, Spain, Sweden and the United Kingdom). 

The rebranding came alongside the re-launch of YouTube Music as a music streaming service, which reintroduced a music-oriented subscription option (YouTube Music Premium) slotted below YouTube Premium at a US$9.99 pricing, competing primarily with Apple Music and Spotify. The rebranding also came amid internal concerns that the previous "YouTube Red" name could be confused with internet pornography website RedTube.

By July 2019, YouTube Premium and YouTube Music Premium were available in approximately 60 countries and territories with a subscription price difference. On April 20, 2020, support was added for Unified Payments Interface for subscribers in India.

In August 2021, YouTube began piloting a second subscription tier, "YouTube Premium Lite" in European markets such as Belgium, Denmark, Finland, Luxembourg, Norway and Sweden, at a price point of €6.99. It contains only the ad-free viewing benefit.

In September 2022, YouTube tested paywalling 4K resolution streaming of any YouTube video behind YouTube Premium. Amid criticism, this pilot ended in mid-October 2022.

Features  
A YouTube Premium subscription allows users to watch videos on YouTube without advertisements across the website and its mobile apps, including the dedicated YouTube Music, YouTube Gaming, and YouTube Kids apps and services. Through the apps, users can also save videos to their device for offline viewing, play their audio in the background, and in picture-in-picture mode on Android Oreo and newer. YouTube Premium also offers original content that is exclusive to subscribers, which is created and published by YouTube's largest creators.

Content 

YouTube Premium offers original films and series produced in collaboration with professional studios and YouTube personalities, under the banner YouTube Originals. For multi-episode series, the first episode of a YouTube Originals series is available free. In selected countries where the service is not yet available, individual episodes can also be purchased through YouTube or Google TV. Access to YouTube Originals is also included in YouTube's separate streaming television service YouTube TV, but a YouTube Premium subscription is still required for the service's other benefits.

In November 2018, it was reported that YouTube was planning to offer some of its premium shows available for free on an ad-supported basis by 2020. The Premium subscription would still cover ad-free access, timed exclusivity windows for original content, and content that is not made freely-available.

Reception 
Reception to YouTube Premium has been mixed amongst consumers and journalists alike. David Nield of Wired argues that the premium service is worth it for consumers, saying that in addition to including a music streaming service, the lack of ads and the ability to download videos and having videos played in the background is useful for consumers. YouTube releasing experimental features as well to subscribers was a benefit to Nield, which as of writing included the rollout of pinch to zoom in videos. Ashley Maready of The Motley Fool concurred with Nield in her review, while additionally noting that the benefits also extend out to YouTube Kids.

Adamya Sharma of Android Authority argued that the service is only worth it for avid YouTube viewers and that a YouTube Premium subscription would not be worth it if the user did not use all of its features. Additionally, Sharma strongly criticized the manner in which YouTube nagged its viewers to subscribe to Premium and claimed that its attempts have driven users to competitor TikTok. Some have additionally noted that YouTube Premium's paid features can easily also be replicated with free online tools, particularly with YouTube video downloader tools replacing Premium's downloading feature and Adblock removing the need to pay to remove ads.

Licensing terms for channels 
In May 2014, prior to the official unveiling of the Music Key service, the independent music trade organization Worldwide Independent Network alleged that YouTube was using non-negotiable contracts with independent labels that were "undervalued" in comparison to other streaming services, and stated that YouTube threatened to block a label's videos from public access if they did not agree to the new terms. In a statement to the Financial Times in June 2014, Robert Kyncl confirmed that these measures were "to ensure that all content on the platform is governed by its new contractual terms". Stating that 90% of labels had reached deals, he went on to say that "while we wish that we had [a] 100% success rate, we understand that is not likely an achievable goal and therefore it is our responsibility to our users and the industry to launch the enhanced music experience". The Financial Times later reported that YouTube had reached an aggregate deal with Merlin Network—a trade group representing over 20,000 independent labels, for their inclusion in the service. However, YouTube itself has not confirmed the deal.

Following the unveiling of YouTube Red, it was stated that these same contractual requirements would now apply to all YouTube Partner Program members; partners who do not accept the new terms and revenue sharing agreements related to the YouTube Red service will have their videos blocked entirely in regions where YouTube Red is available. The YouTube channels of ESPN were a notable party affected by the change; a representative of ESPN's parent, The Walt Disney Company, stated that conflicts with third-party rights holders in regard to sports footage contained in ESPN's YouTube videos prevented them from being offered under the new terms. A limited number of older videos remain on ESPN's main channel.

Similarly, a large amount of content licensed by Japanese record labels became unavailable in regions where YouTube Red is available. It was believed that the ability to download videos for offline viewing in YouTube Red was a subject of hesitation for Japanese media companies due to the need to monitor when, where, and how content is being used in accordance with Japanese copyright laws, hence their content was blocked under the new requirements.

See also 
 Subscription video on demand
 List of streaming media services

References

External links 

 
2014 establishments in California
Internet properties established in 2015
Subscription video on demand services
Mass media companies